Deh Now-e Kakan (also Romanized as Deh Now-e Kākān; also known as Deh Now and Towḩīdābād) is a village in Kakan Rural District, in the Central District of Boyer-Ahmad County, Kohgiluyeh and Boyer-Ahmad Province, Iran. At the 2006 census, its population was 40, in 9 families.

References 

Populated places in Boyer-Ahmad County